Eugnosta falarica is a species of moth of the family Tortricidae. It is found in Mongolia.

Distribution
Regions of the Russian Federation: the Trans-Baikal.

References

Moths described in 1970
Eugnosta